Thomas Johansson was the defending champion, but lost in the quarterfinals this year.

James Blake won the tournament, beating Paradorn Srichaphan in the final, 6–1, 7–6(8–6).

Seeds

Draw

Finals

Top half

Bottom half

External links
 Main draw
 Qualifying draw

2005 ATP Tour
2005 Stockholm Open